Krefeld, also spelled Crefeld until 1925 (though the spelling was still being used in British papers throughout the Second World War), is a city in North Rhine-Westphalia, Germany. It is located northwest of Düsseldorf, its center lying just a few kilometers to the west of the river Rhine; the borough of Uerdingen is situated directly on the Rhine. Because of its economic past, Krefeld is often referred to as the "Velvet and Silk City". It is accessed by the autobahns A57 (Cologne–Nijmegen) and A44 (Aachen–Düsseldorf–Dortmund–Kassel).

The Uerdingen line isogloss, separating general dialectical areas in Germany and neighboring Germanic-speaking countries, runs through and is named after Krefeld's Uerdingen district, originally an independent municipality.

History

Early history
Records first mention Krefeld in 1105 under the name of Krinvelde.

In February 1598, Walburga, wife of Adolf van Nieuwenaar, and last Countess of Limburg and Moers, gave the County of Moers, which included Krefeld, to Maurice, Prince of Orange. After her death in 1600, John William of Cleves took possession of these lands, but Maurice successfully defended his heritage in 1601. Krefeld and Moers would remain under the jurisdiction of the House of Orange and the Dutch Republic during the Dutch Golden Age. The growth of the town began in that century, partially because Krefeld was one of few towns spared the horrors of the Thirty Years' War (1618–1648). The town of Uerdingen, incorporated into Krefeld in the 20th century, was less fortunate, almost ceasing to exist, destroyed at the hands of troops from Hesse during the Thirty Years' War.

After the death of William III of Orange in 1702, Krefeld passed to the Kingdom of Prussia. The Battle of Krefeld occurred nearby in 1758 during the Seven Years' War. Krefeld and Uerdingen were included within the Prussian Province of Jülich-Cleves-Berg in 1815 (after 1822 the Rhine Province).

In 1872 Krefeld became an independent city within Rhenish Prussia. In 1918 during the First World War the Belgian Army used it as a base during the occupation of the Rhineland. In 1929 Krefeld and Uerdingen merged to form Krefeld-Uerdingen; in 1940 the name was shortened to simply Krefeld.

The Mennonites of Krefeld 
From 1607 Mennonites arrived in Krefeld, as in nearby Gronau, from neighboring Roman Catholic territories where they were persecuted. They sought refuge in the lands of the more tolerant House of Orange-Nassau, at the time rulers of Krefeld; in 1657 their congregation was officially recognized and in 1693 they were allowed to build their own church, although hidden in a back yard (which still exists, reconstructed after World War II, with about 800 members). Also the Quaker Evangelists received a sympathetic audience among the larger of the German-Mennonite congregations around Krefeld, Gronau, Emden and Altona, Hamburg. In 1683 a group of thirteen Mennonite families (twelve of them Mennonite-Quakers) left Krefeld to re-settle in Pennsylvania in order to enjoy religious freedom. They crossed the Atlantic on the ship Concord, and founded the settlement of Germantown (now incorporated in Philadelphia), invited by William Penn, and thus beginning the Pennsylvania Dutch ethnic identity. The most important Mennonite family of Krefeld were the silk merchants and silk weaving industrialists Von der Leyen who, by 1763, employed half of Krefeld's population of 6,082 in their factories. Their residence, built from 1791, is the current City Hall.

The Jews of Krefeld 
Jews were listed as citizens of Krefeld from 1617. In 1764 a synagogue was erected, and by 1812, under French rule, the town included 196 Jewish families, with three Jewish-owned banks. Under Napoleon, the town became the capital for the surrounding Jewish communities including over 5000 Jews, and by 1897 they comprised 1.8% of the population. In 1846 a Jewish representative was voted onto the town's municipal council, while rising antisemitism was noted during these elections. A reform synagogue was built in 1876, arousing opposition from the Orthodox community. A Jewish school existed in the town, with more than 200 students around 1900.

In November 1938 during Kristallnacht, the two synagogues were attacked.  In 1941 following an order from Hitler to deport the German Jews to the east, Jews from the town were sent to the area around Riga and murdered there. In 1945, the U.S. Army occupied the city and placed Henry Kissinger, then an Army private and later Secretary of State of the United States, in charge of the city administration.

In 2008 a new synagogue, library and Jewish cultural center were erected on the location of one of the demolished synagogues. Around 1100 Jews were reported to live in and around Krefeld at the time.

World War II

On 11 December 1941, during World War II, a detailed report on the transport of Jews from Krefeld and its surroundings listed 1007 Jews from Krefeld and Duisburg, were deported to the Šķirotava Railway Station near Riga, later to become Jungfernhof concentration camp. They were transported in freezing conditions with no drinking water for more than two days. Almost immediately upon arrival they were shot in the Rumbula forest massacre.

On 21 June 1943 British bombs destroyed many buildings in the east part of the city; a firestorm consumed large parts of the city center (apart from the central train station, which remained intact apart from minor damage). On 3 March 1945 US troops entered Krefeld, among them the later U.S. Secretary of State Henry Kissinger.

During the Cold War, the city was host to the 16th Signal Regiment of the United Kingdom's Royal Corps of Signals stationed at Bradbury Barracks. The town became part of the new state of North Rhine-Westphalia after World War II.

Points of interest

 Linn Castle (German)
 Botanischer Garten Krefeld, a municipal botanical garden
 Krefeld Zoo
 Lange and Esters Houses, neighbouring houses by early Mies van der Rohe, now serving as local contemporary art museum venues
 Kaiser Wilhelm Museum, contemporary art museum
 German Textile Museum
 Galopprennbahn Krefeld, horse racing track
 The well-preserved historic old towns of the formerly independent districts Uerdingen, Linn and Hüls

Districts

There are a number of districts in Krefeld. Each has a municipal representative, with representatives chosen by local elections. The districts are:

Municipal absorptions
Cities and places that were incorporated into Krefeld:
 1901: Linn (Stadtrecht since 1314)
 1907: Bockum, Verberg und Oppum (all mayoralty Bockum)
 1929:
 Krefeld became an independent city
 Uerdingen, Krefeld (received municipal law in 1255/1344, added Hohenbudberg in today's Duisburg district Friemersheim)
 Fischeln, Krefeld district
 Traar, Krefeld district
 Gellep and Stratum (in Lank), Krefeld district
 Forstwald (Vorst), Krefeld district
 Benrad und Hülserberg (Hüls), Kempen
 1975: Locality of Hüls from Kempen (since 1970 integrated and belonged since 1929 to the Kempen-Krefeld district; in 1936 Orbroich had been independent)

Historical population of Krefeld

¹ Census data

Largest migrant communities in Krefeld by 31.12.2017 are :

Politics

Mayor
The current Mayor of Krefeld is Frank Meyer of the Social Democratic Party (SPD), elected in 2015 and re-elected in 2020. The most recent mayoral election was held on 13 September 2020, with a runoff held on 27 September, and the results were as follows:

! rowspan=2 colspan=2| Candidate
! rowspan=2| Party
! colspan=2| First round
! colspan=2| Second round
|-
! Votes
! %
! Votes
! %
|-
| bgcolor=| 
| align=left| Frank Meyer
| align=left| Social Democratic Party
| 36,025
| 43.4
| 37,125
| 62.4
|-
| bgcolor=| 
| align=left| Kerstin Jensen
| align=left| Christian Democratic Union
| 22,901
| 27.6
| 22,366
| 37.6
|-
| bgcolor=| 
| align=left| Thorsten Hansen
| align=left| Alliance 90/The Greens
| 12,778
| 15.4
|-
| bgcolor=| 
| align=left| Martin Vincentz
| align=left| Alternative for Germany
| 4,186
| 5.0
|-
| bgcolor=| 
| align=left| Joachim C. Heitmann
| align=left| Free Democratic Party
| 3,578
| 4.3
|-
| bgcolor=| 
| align=left| Richard Jansen
| align=left| Die PARTEI
| 1,551
| 1.9
|-
| 
| align=left| Salih Tahusoglu
| align=left| We Make Krefeld
| 1,047
| 1.3
|-
| 
| align=left| Andreas Drabben
| align=left| Independent Voters' Association/Free Voters
| 783
| 0.9
|-
| bgcolor=| 
| align=left| Peter Lommes
| align=left| German Communist Party
| 207
| 0.2
|-
! colspan=3| Valid votes
! 83,056
! 98.8
! 59,491
! 99.0
|-
! colspan=3| Invalid votes
! 990
! 1.2
! 612
! 1.0
|-
! colspan=3| Total
! 84,046
! 100.0
! 60,103
! 100.0
|-
! colspan=3| Electorate/voter turnout
! 180,496
! 46.6
! 180,256
! 33.3
|-
| colspan=7| Source: State Returning Officer
|}

The following is a list of mayors of Krefeld from 1848:
 1848–1872: Ludwig Heinrich Ondereyck
 1872–1881: Friedrich Christian Roos
 1882–1903: Ernst Küper
 1903–1905: Wilhelm Hammerschmidt
 1905–1911: Adalbert Oehler
 1911–1930: Johannes Johansen
 1945–1946: Johannes Stepkes
 1946–1947: Wilhelm Warsch
 1947–1949: Hermann Passen
 1949–1951: Hanns Müller (FDP)
 1951–1956: Johannes Hauser (CDU)
 1956–1961: Josef Hellenbrock (SPD)
 1961–1968: Herbert van Hüllen (CDU)
 1968–1982: Hansheinz Hauser (CDU)
 1982–1989: Dieter Pützhofen, first term in office (CDU)
 1989–1994: Willi Wahl (SPD)
 1994–2004: Dieter Pützhofen, second term in office (CDU)
 2004–2015: Gregor Kathstede (CDU)
 2015–present: Frank Meyer (SPD)

The following is a list of city counsellors from 1946 until 1999:
 1946–1949: Johan Stepkes
 1949–1964: Bernhard Heun
 1964–1986: Hermann Steffens
 1986–1988: Alfred Dahlmann
 1988–1999: Heinz-Josef Vogt

City council

The Krefeld city council governs the city alongside the Mayor. The most recent city council election was held on 13 September 2020, and the results were as follows:

! colspan=2| Party
! Votes
! %
! +/-
! Seats
! +/-
|-
| bgcolor=| 
| align=left| Christian Democratic Union (CDU)
| 24,977
| 30.2
|  3.4
| 17
|  3
|-
| bgcolor=| 
| align=left| Social Democratic Party (SPD)
| 23,599
| 28.6
|  6.1
| 17
|  3
|-
| bgcolor=| 
| align=left| Alliance 90/The Greens (Grüne)
| 16,662
| 20.2
|  9.0
| 12
|  6
|-
| bgcolor=| 
| align=left| Free Democratic Party (FDP)
| 4,834
| 5.9
|  0.5
| 3
|  1
|-
| bgcolor=| 
| align=left| Alternative for Germany (AfD)
| 4,476
| 5.4
|  1.2
| 3
|  1
|-
| bgcolor=| 
| align=left| The Left (Die Linke)
| 2,664
| 3.2
|  1.4
| 2
|  1
|-
| bgcolor=| 
| align=left| Die PARTEI (PARTEI)
| 2,031
| 2.5
|  1.3
| 1
| ±0
|-
| 
| align=left| We Make Krefeld (WIR)
| 1,200
| 1.5
| New
| 1
| New
|-
| 
| align=left| Independent Voters' Association/Free Voters (UWG/FW)
| 1,023
| 1.2
|  0.5
| 1
| ±0
|-
| 
| align=left| Voters' Association Our Future (WUZ)
| 842
| 1.0
| New
| 1
| New
|-
| colspan=7 bgcolor=lightgrey| 
|-
| bgcolor=| 
| align=left| Independents
| 267
| 0.3
| –
| 0
| –
|-
| bgcolor=| 
| align=left| German Communist Party (DKP)
| 7
| 0.0
| New
| 0
| New
|-
! colspan=2| Valid votes
! 82,582
! 98.5
! 
! 
! 
|-
! colspan=2| Invalid votes
! 1,216
! 1.5
! 
! 
! 
|-
! colspan=2| Total
! 83,798
! 100.0
! 
! 58
! ±0
|-
! colspan=2| Electorate/voter turnout
! 180,491
! 46.4
!  1.2
! 
! 
|-
| colspan=7| Source: State Returning Officer
|}

Transport

Krefeld is connected to the Deutsche Bahn network with several stations, including its main station, Krefeld Hauptbahnhof. They are served by Intercity, Regional-Express and Regionalbahn trains. The Düsseldorf-based Rheinbahn operates a Stadtbahn service to the centrally located Rheinstraße stop. This line was the first electric inter-city rail line in Europe, established in 1898, and commonly called the K-Bahn because of the letter "K" used to denote the trains to Krefeld. Nowadays, in the VRR notation, it is called U76, with the morning and afternoon express trains numbered as U70, the line number there coloured red instead of the usual blue used for U-Bahn lines. The term K-Bahn, however, prevails in common usage.

The city of Krefeld itself operates four tramway and several bus lines under the umbrella of SWK MOBIL, a city-owned company. Since 2010, 19 of the oldest trams of the type Duewag GT8 were replaced by modern barrier-free trams of the type Bombardier Flexity Outlook. SWK Mobil owns an option to buy another 19 trams of the same type to replace the last 19 Duewag M8 trams. The whole tram fleet will then be barrier-free. Next to that the city plans to extend the line 044 in Krefeld-Hüls to connect the northern district of Hüls with the Krefeld downtown area.

Economy 
The headquarters of Fressnapf, a pet food retailer franchise company, are situated in Krefeld.

The Nirosta steelworks, once owned by ThyssenKrupp, was sold in 2012 to Outokumpu.

International relations
Since 1964, the city has hosted an "honors program in foreign language (German) studies" for high school students from Indiana, United States. The program annually places approximately thirty carefully selected high school juniors with families in and around Krefeld for intensive German language training. Since 1973, the fire services of Krefeld and twin city Leicester have played each other in an annual 'friendly' football match.

Twin towns – sister cities

Krefeld is twinned with:

 Venlo, Netherlands (1964)
 Leicester, England, United Kingdom (1969)
 Dunkirk, France (1974)
 Leiden, Netherlands (1974)
 Charlotte, United States (1986)
 Oder-Spree (district), Germany (1990)
 Ulyanovsk, Russia (1993)
 Kayseri, Turkey (2009)

Notable people

Scientists and academics
Charlotte Auerbach (1899–1994)genetic scientist
Edmund ter Meer (1859–1931)chemist and industrialist
Felix Kracht (1912–2002)aerospace engineer, an Airbus pioneer and former Senior Vice President
Fritz ter Meer (1884–1967)chemist and industrialist
Leopold Löwenheim (1878–1957)logician
Max Zorn (1906–1993)mathematician
Rudi Dornbusch (1942–2002)economist

Writers, poets and journalists
Bernhard Hennen (born 1966)writer of fantasy literature
Bodo Hauser (1946–2004)journalist and writer
Erol Yesilkaya (born 1976)Turkish-German screenwriter
Johannes Floehr (born 1991)author and comedian
Kurt Feltz (1910–1982)poet
Margarethe Schreinemakers (born 1958)television presenter and journalist

Musicians
Albert Dohmen (born 1956)opera singer
Andrea Berg (born 1966)singer
Blind Guardian (1984-)Power Metal band
Heinrich Band (1821–1860)inventor of the bandoneón
Maria Madlen Madsen (1905–1990)opera singer 
Ralf Hütter (born 1946)leader of electronic music pioneers Kraftwerk
Saki Kaskas (1971–2016)Greek-Canadian video game music composer

Visual artists
Albert Oehlen (born 1954)artist
Charles J. Kleingrothe (1864–1925)photographer
Heinrich Campendonk (1889–1957)German-Dutch painter and graphic designer
Johan Thorn Prikker (1868–1932)Dutch artist
Johannes Itten (1888–1967)Swiss expressionist painter, designer, teacher, writer and theorist
Joseph Beuys (1921–1986)artist
Markus Oehlen (born 1956)artist
Theo Akkermann (1907–1982)sculptor

Sportspeople
Friedhelm Funkel (born 1953)football manager and player
Juliane Schenk (born 1982)German badminton player
Martin Hyun (born 1979)German-American ice hockey player and author
Philip Hindes (born 1992)British sprint cyclist
Werner Rittberger (1891–1975)figure skater
Marc Schaub (born 1992)professional ice hockey player

Businessmen
Ben Neumann (1966–2020)American entrepreneur and film producer
Edmund ter Meer (1859–1931)chemist and industrialist
Felix Kracht (1912–2002)aerospace engineer, an Airbus pioneer and former Senior Vice President
Fritz ter Meer (1884–1967)chemist and industrialist
Thierry Hermès (1801–1878)French businessman and founder of Hermès

Military personnel
Emil Schäfer (1891–1917)World War I aviator
Heinz Harmel (1906–2000)SS commander, Knight's Cross Holder
Werner Voss (1897–1917)World War I aviator

Politicians 
 Jürgen Lenders (born 1966), politician (FDP)

References

External links

  
 Krefeld-Linner Flachsmarkt
 Krefeld Ice hockey team
 KFC Uerdingen
 Stadttheater Krefeld

 
Cities in North Rhine-Westphalia
Populated places on the Rhine
Holocaust locations in Germany